Frisco Tornado is a 1950 American Western film directed by R. G. Springsteen and written by M. Coates Webster. The film stars Allan Lane, Eddy Waller, Martha Hyer, Stephen Chase, Ross Ford and Mauritz Hugo. The film was released on September 6, 1950, by Republic Pictures.

Plot

Cast
Allan Lane as Marshal Rocky Lane 
Black Jack as Black Jack
Eddy Waller as Nugget Clark
Martha Hyer as Jean Martin
Stephen Chase as Jim Crail
Ross Ford as Paul Weston
Mauritz Hugo as Henchman Brod
Lane Bradford as Henchman Mike Bristol
Hal Price as Storekeeper
Rex Lease as Henchman
George Chesebro as Stage Guard
Edmund Cobb as 1st Stage Driver

References

External links 
 

1950 films
American Western (genre) films
1950 Western (genre) films
Republic Pictures films
Films directed by R. G. Springsteen
Films adapted into comics
American black-and-white films
1950s English-language films
1950s American films